The Department of City Planning (DCP) is the department of the government of New York City responsible for setting the framework of city's physical and socioeconomic planning. The department is responsible for land use and environmental review, preparing plans and policies, and providing information to and advising the Mayor of New York City, Borough presidents, the New York City Council, Community Boards and other local government bodies on issues relating to the macro-scale development of the city. The department is responsible for changes in New York City's city map, purchase and sale of city-owned real estate and office space and of the designation of landmark and historic district status. Its regulations are compiled in title 62 of the New York City Rules. The most recent Director of City Planning Marisa Lago resigned in December, 2021 following her confirmation as Under Secretary for International Trade at the United States Department of Commerce.
__toc__

City Planning Commission
The City Planning Commission was created under the 1936 New York City Charter. It started functioning in 1938 with seven members, all of whom were appointed by the Mayor and was given responsibility for creating a master plan.

The Commission currently operates under the terms of the revised 1989 Charter, with 13 members. The board consists of a chair, who serves at the Mayor's pleasure, and 12 other members who serve terms in office of five years on a staggered basis. The Mayor appoints the chair, who serves ex officio as the Director of City Planning, and six other members. Each Borough President appoints one member. The New York City Public Advocate appoints one member.

Greenmarkets
In 1976, after the original Greenmarket on 59th Street & 2nd Avenue proved to be successful, the New York City Department of City Planning proposed to the Council on the Environment of New York City opening a second farmers market in Union Square and a third market in Brooklyn. The Union Square farmers market was smaller and considerably less hectic than the 59th Street & 2nd Avenue location. The Brooklyn Market was large and nearly as successful and the 59th Street & 2nd Avenue location. The land where the Brooklyn Market was located was privately owned by the Brooklyn Academy of Music. The Union Square market and the 59th Street & 2nd Avenue market were publicly owned by the city.

See also
 City Environmental Quality Review
 Uniform Land Use Review Procedure

References

External links
NYC Department of City Planning
 Department of City Planning in the Rules of the City of New York

City Planning
Urban planning in New York City